In geometry, Cayley's sextic (sextic of Cayley, Cayley's sextet) is a plane curve, a member of the sinusoidal spiral family, first discussed by Colin Maclaurin in 1718.  Arthur Cayley was the first to study the curve in detail and it was named after him in 1900 by Raymond Clare Archibald.

The curve is symmetric about the x-axis (y = 0) and self-intersects at y = 0, x = −a/8. Other intercepts are at the origin, at (a, 0) and with the y-axis at ±&hairsp;a

The curve is the pedal curve (or roulette) of a cardioid with respect to its cusp.

Equations of the curve
The equation of the curve in polar coordinates is

r = 4a cos3(θ/3)

In Cartesian coordinates the equation is

4(x2 + y2 − (a/4)x)3 = 27(a/4)2(x2 + y2)2 .

Cayley's sextic may be parametrised (as a periodic function, period π, ℝ→ℝ2) by the equations

 x = cos3t cos 3t
 y = cos3t sin 3t.

The node is at t = ±π/3.

References

External links
 Mathworld

Sextic curves